Rutte cabinet  may refer to:
 First Rutte cabinet, a Dutch minority cabinet (2010–2012)
 Second Rutte cabinet, a Dutch majority cabinet (2012–2017)
 Third Rutte cabinet, a Dutch majority cabinet (2017-2021)
 Fourth Rutte cabinet, a Dutch majority cabinet (2022-present)